Christopher Kullmann (born 19 September 1986) is a German former professional footballer who played as a forward.

Career
Kullmann was born in Katzhütte. He played his first Bundesliga match for Borussia Dortmund, and first fully professional game, on 15 February 2009 in a 1–1 draw against Energie Cottbus. He was substituted in the 90th minute. On 27 April 2009, the 22-year-old striker signed a professional contract with Borussia Dortmund that kept at the club until 30 June 2011.

References

External links
 

1986 births
Living people
German footballers
Association football forwards
Bundesliga players
3. Liga players
Regionalliga players
1. FC Magdeburg players
Borussia Dortmund players
Borussia Dortmund II players
Arminia Bielefeld players
FC 08 Homburg players
KSV Hessen Kassel players
VfB Germania Halberstadt players